Naming the motto of the year in Iran is done by Ali Khamenei Supreme leader every new year in Nowrooz. The first instance began in 1999, where he selected the "title of year".

1990–1999
Supreme leader announces the title of the new year by messages broadcast on IRIB TV in new years eve.
 1990: Emphasis on "Internal Transformation and Reform"
 1991: Emphasis on "Bright Morning"
 1992: Emphasis on "Strengthening Spirituality"
 1993: Emphasis on "Social Justice"
 1994: Emphasis on "Saving"
 1995: Emphasis on "Work Ethics, Social Discipline, Economic order"
 1996: Emphasis on the "Necessity of Avoiding waste and Preserving the Wealth and Public Resources of the Country"
 1997: Emphasis on "Attention to Spirituality and Moral Virtues"
 1998: Emphasis on "Saving and avoiding  اسراف luxury(waste), contentment and standing on Islamic and revolutionary positions"
 1999: Year of Imam Khomeini, in honor of 100 years since the birth of the founder of the Islamic Republic

2000–2009
 2000: Year of Imam Ali
 2001:National authority and job creation, (Name recommended by Mohammad Khatami then Iranian President)
 2002: Greatness and Imam Hossein Pride
 2003: Serve
 2004: Year of Answering (Government ministries answered people's questions)
 2005: National correlation and public cooperation
 2006: Year of Great Prophet Mohammad (possibly named in relation to Jyllands-Posten Muhammad cartoons controversy)
 2007: Year of National Unity and Islamic Coherence
 2008: Innovation and flourishing (30 year anniversary of revolution)
 2009: Moving toward reforming consumption

2010–2019
 2010: Extra willing, extra work
 2011: Economic jihad (name selected due to Iranian subsidy reform plan, and mounting international sanctions)
 2012: National production and supporting Iranian capital and businesses
 2013: Political and economic epic
 2014: Economy and culture, through national will and jihadi management
 2015: Government and people, Empathy and compassion
 2016: Resisting economy: action and work
 2017: Resisting economy: production – job creation
 2018: Supporting Iranian products
 2019: Production prosperity
 2020: Jumping production
 2021: Production, supports and barriers removing

References

1990 establishments in Iran
Nowruz
Ali Khamenei